Shinho Lee (born 1977) is a South Korean screenwriter and arts professor in Rita & Burton Goldberg Department of Dramatic Writing at Tisch School of the Arts, New York University.

Lee is best known for his work on “The Chaser (film)” (2008, Na Hong-jin). It was screened in the Official Selection Midnight Screening section at the 2008 Cannes Film Festival. The remake rights to the film were bought by Warner Bros. with Leonardo DiCaprio named as a potential star.

His recent work “While the Women Are Sleeping” (based on the short story by Javier Marías) was directed by Wayne Wang (“Smoke (film)”, “The Joy Luck Club (film)”, “Maid in Manhattan”) and screened in the Official Panorama Special section at the 66th Berlin International Film Festival.

He also wrote “Sayonara Itsuka (サヨナライツカ, Saying Good-bye, Oneday)” (based on the novel by Hitonari Tsuji) that stars Miho Nakayama from Shunji Iwai’s “Love Letter (1995 film)”.

His other work includes a number of plays and screenplays: “Last September” (screenplay, to be produced by Terence Chang (“Red Cliff (film)”, “Face/Off”, "Mission: Impossible 2")), “Tokyo Year Zero” (screenplay, based on the novel by David Peace (“The Damned Utd”)), “The Red Snow” (screenplay, the Winner of The 2003 Harley-Merrill International Screenwriting Award sponsored by MPA and RKO Pictures and The 2002 CAPE (Coalition of Asian Pacifics in Entertainment) Foundation’s New Writers Award sponsored by The 20th Century FOX), “Dream of No Words” (play, Hartford Stage’s 2003 Brand New Reading Series), “The Water Mirrors” (play, American Living Room with Lincoln Center & Here Arts Center) and “Butterfly” (play, Director’s Company’s Don’t Blink with Second Stage Theatre).

He is currently writing an action thriller “The Goldmine” set in Australia and Korea that is to be produced by Janelle Landers and Aidan O’Bryan of WBMC (“Son of a Gun (film)”, “Wasted on the Young”) and developing an action TV pilot "N.O.C." with Jeremiah McMillan of Global Content Group.

He received his BFA in Film & TV and MFA in Dramatic Writing from Tisch School of the Arts, New York University. He is also an alumnus in American Film Institute’s Screenwriting Program.

Filmography
 While the Women Are Sleeping (2016) - screenplay
 Sayonara Itsuka (Saying Good-bye, Oneday; 2010) - screenplay
 The Chaser (film) (2008) - screenplay
 My Mighty Princess (2008) - screenplay
 Kimono (1998) - director, screenplay

References

External links 

이신호 - 네이버 프로필

1977 births
Living people
Male screenwriters
People from Seoul
South Korean screenwriters